Noah Aelterman (born 7 April 2001) is a Belgian professional footballer who plays as a forward for Belgian National Division 1 club Knokke.

Club career
Aelterman began his career at the youth academy of Club Brugge. On 22 August 2020, Aelterman made his debut for Brugge's reserve side, Club NXT, in the Belgian First Division B against RWDM47. He started as NXT lost 2–0.

Career statistics

References

External links

2001 births
Living people
Belgian footballers
Association football forwards
RWDM47 players
K.S.C. Lokeren Oost-Vlaanderen players
K.A.A. Gent players
Club Brugge KV players
Club NXT players
Royal Knokke F.C. players
Challenger Pro League players
Belgium youth international footballers